Johann Heinrich Loewe (December 12, 1808 – January 15, 1892) was an Austrian philosopher born in Prague. Dr. and k.k. Professor of philosophie, Wife Magdalena Babitsch, born in Vienna 1814, dead 17.9.1880 in Gross-Gmain. 3 daughters,     

From 1839 to 1851 he was a professor of philosophy in Salzburg, and in 1851 was appointed professor of theoretical and moral philosophy at the University of Prague. He was a prominent supporter of philosopher Anton Günther, and author of a biography on minister Johann Emanuel Veith (Johann Emanuel Veith. Eine Biographie, 1879). Other noted works by Loewe include:
 Über den Begriff der Logik, (On the perception of logic), 1849
 Das spekulative System des René Descartes, (The speculative system of René Descartes), 1854
 Die Philosophie Fichtes. Mit einem Anhange über des Gottesbegriff Spinozas (The philosophy of Fichte, with an appendix on Spinoza's concept of God), 1862
 Der Kampf zwischen dem Realismus und Nominalismus im Mittelalter, sein Ursprung und sein Verlauf, (The struggle between realism and nominalism in the Middle Ages, its origin and its behaviour), 1876
 Lehrbuch der Logik, (Textbook of logic), 1881
 Die speculative Idee der Freiheit, ihre Widersacher, ihre praktische Verwertung, (The speculative idea of freedom, its antagonists, its practical application), 1890.

References 
 translated biography of Johann Heinrich Loewe

Austrian philosophers
Academic staff of Charles University
1808 births
1892 deaths